The following is a list of football stadiums in Belarus with a total capacity of at least 4,000 spectators.

See also
List of association football stadiums by capacity
List of European stadiums by capacity

External links
Football Federation of Belarus
List of Stadiums Pictures in Belarus

 
Belarus
Stadiums
Football stadiums